Ujsoły  is a village in Żywiec County, Silesian Voivodeship, in southern Poland, close to the border with Slovakia. It is the seat of the gmina (administrative district) called Gmina Ujsoły.

The village has a population of 2,392.

References

Villages in Żywiec County